William Foster Garland (July 1, 1875 – March 19, 1941) was an Ontario merchant and political figure. He represented Carleton in the House of Commons of Canada as a Conservative member from 1912 to 1917 and from 1921 to 1935.

He was born in Bells Corners, Ontario in 1875, the son of Absalom Garland. He studied at the Ontario College of Pharmacy and became a druggist. In 1902, he married Margaret Green. Garland served on Ottawa City Council in 1912, representing Victoria Ward. He was first elected to the House of Commons in a 1912 by-election held after the death of Edward Kidd. Garland owned a drug store and lived in the Hintonburg neighbourhood of Ottawa.

Electoral record

References 
 Canadian Parliamentary Guide, 1933, AL Normandin

External links 
 

1875 births
1941 deaths
Conservative Party of Canada (1867–1942) MPs
Members of the House of Commons of Canada from Ontario
Ottawa city councillors